Éva Kun (7 November 1917 – 2 April 1982) was a Hungarian fencer. She competed in the women's individual foil event at the 1948 Summer Olympics.

References

External links
 

1917 births
1982 deaths
Hungarian female foil fencers
Olympic fencers of Hungary
Fencers at the 1948 Summer Olympics
20th-century Hungarian women